Nerupukkul Eeram is a 1984 Indian Tamil-language film directed by R. Krishnamoorthy. It stars Thyagarajan and Ambika. The film was produced by Sathya Movies.

Cast 

Thyagarajan
Ambika
Rajeev
Urvashi
Nizhalgal Ravi

Soundtrack 
Soundtrack was composed by Ilaiyaraaja.

References

External links

1984 films
Films scored by Ilaiyaraaja
1980s Tamil-language films